Glauconycteris is a genus of vespertilionid bats found in Africa.

Species
Glauconycteris alboguttata - Allen's striped bat
Glauconycteris argentata - silvered bat
Glauconycteris atra - blackish butterfly bat
Glauconycteris beatrix - Beatrix's bat
Glauconycteris curryae - Curry's bat
Glauconycteris egeria - Bibundi bat
Glauconycteris gleni - Glen's wattled bat
Glauconycteris humeralis - Allen's spotted bat
Glauconycteris kenyacola - Kenyan wattled bat
Glauconycteris machadoi - Machado's butterfly bat
Glauconycteris poensis - Abo bat
Glauconycteris superba - pied butterfly bat
Glauconycteris variegata - variegated butterfly bat

References

 

 
Bat genera
Taxa named by George Edward Dobson